Gordon David Plotkin,  (born 9 September 1946) is a theoretical computer scientist in the School of Informatics at the University of Edinburgh. Plotkin is probably best known for his introduction of structural operational semantics (SOS) and his work on denotational semantics. In particular, his notes on A Structural Approach to Operational Semantics were very influential. He has contributed to many other areas of computer science.

Education 
Plotkin was educated at the University of Glasgow and the University of Edinburgh, gaining his Bachelor of Science degree in 1967 and PhD in 1972 supervised by Rod Burstall.

Career and research
Plotkin has remained at Edinburgh, and was, with Burstall and Robin Milner, a co-founder of the Laboratory for Foundations of Computer Science (LFCS). His former doctoral students include Luca Cardelli, Philippa Gardner, Doug Gurr, Eugenio Moggi, and Lǐ Wèi.

Awards and honours
Plotkin was elected a Fellow of the Royal Society (FRS) in 1992, and a Fellow of the Royal Society of Edinburgh (FRSE) and is a Member of the Academia Europæa. He is also a winner of the Royal Society Wolfson Research Merit Award. Plotkin received the Milner Award in 2012 for "his fundamental research into programming semantics with lasting impact on both the principles and design of programming languages." His nomination for the Royal Society reads:

References 

1946 births
Living people
British computer scientists
Fellows of the Royal Society
Members of Academia Europaea
Royal Society Wolfson Research Merit Award holders
Formal methods people
Programming language researchers
British Jews
Jewish scientists
Alumni of the University of Edinburgh
Academics of the University of Edinburgh
Fellows of the Royal Society of Edinburgh